Paraharmochirus monstrosus is a jumping spider in the genus Paraharmochirus that lives in Papua New Guinea. It has an ant like body.

References

Spiders described in 1915
Salticidae
Spiders of Asia